Edisbel Martínez (born 14 September 1979) is a Cuban archer. She competed in the women's individual event at the 2000 Summer Olympics.

References

External links
 

1979 births
Living people
Cuban female archers
Olympic archers of Cuba
Archers at the 2000 Summer Olympics
People from Sancti Spíritus
20th-century Cuban women
21st-century Cuban women